David McKee (born December 5, 1983) is an American professional hockey goaltender. He most recently played with the Quad City Mallards of the Central Hockey League during the 2011–12 season. McKee was formerly a star college goaltender at Cornell University.

Early life
McKee was born in Midland, Texas. He started for three years at Cornell University. During his record-breaking college career, he had a career record of 65–24–13 with a .926 SV%, 1.71 GAA and 18 shutouts. During the 2003–04 season, he had a shutout streak of 159:27 from December 5 to December 28. Even though his rookie year was astounding, nothing could compare to the end of the 2004–05 season, where over his final 21 games, he allowed just 20 goals while posting a 0.93 goals against average and a .962 save percentage to go along with an 18–2–1 record to help lead his team to win the ECAC title. He led the Cornell Big Red to a season record 19-game unbeaten streak. During that season, McKee also recorded a record-breaking 10 shutouts.

Career 
On April 1, 2006, the Mighty Ducks of Anaheim announced that they signed him with a two-year entry-level contract. Mighty Ducks executive vice president and general manager Brian Burke said, "Over the past two seasons, David McKee has proven to be one of the premier players at the collegiate level. He is a great addition to the core of young talented players within our organization.”

McKee began the season playing for the Augusta Lynx, the ECHL affiliate of the Anaheim Ducks. He was briefly assigned to the Portland Pirates of the AHL, but was sent down to get playing experience. He quickly became starting goaltender for the Lynx, picking-up his first professional win came on October 21, 2006, against the Gwinnett Gladiators. He is currently on top of the ECHL standings, with the most shootout wins (3), the second most wins (8), the fourth most saves (355), and is fifth in minutes played (651).

McKee has been called up to the NHL several times during his first professional season. His first stint began on November 21, 2006, as backup for Jean-Sébastien Giguère while Ilya Bryzgalov was unavailable due to a lower body injury. He was dressed for three games, until Giguère sustained an injury and was scratched against the Calgary Flames on November 26. McKee backed up Mike Wall, who was called up from Portland on the same day. After his fourth game, McKee rejoined the Lynx. McKee also played in the 2006 Men's World Ice Hockey Championships.

Awards and honors

2003-04: ECAC Co-Rookie of the Year
2003-04: Cornell Big Red Most Promising Freshman
2004-05: Cornell Big Red Most Valuable Player
2004-05: ECAC and Ivy League Player of the Year
2004-05: ECAC and Ivy League Goalie of the Year
2004-05: NCAA Hobey Hat Trick Finalist
2006-07: Augusta Lynx Most Valuable Player
2006-07: Augusta Lynx Rookie of the Year
2006-07: Portland Pirates Player of the Week

Records
Cornell Big Red franchise record for most consecutive career starts: 102
Cornell Big Red franchise record for most shutouts in a single season: (2004–05) - 10
ECAC league record for most shutouts in a single season: (2004–05) - 10
NCAA All-Time Individual NCAA Tournament Save Percentage record min. 200 minutes: (2005–06) - .955%
Augusta Lynx franchise record for most wins in a season: (2006–07) - 29

Career statistics

References

Anaheim Ducks
David McKee. Retrieved 26 Nov 2006.
(21 Nov 2006). Ducks Recall Goaltender McKee. Press release.
(26 Nov 2006). Ducks 5, Flames 3. Press release.
(27 Nov 2006). Ducks Reassign McKee. Press release.
(28 Dec 2006). David McKee Recalled from Augusta. Press release.
Augusta Lynx
(12 Oct 2006). Ducks Assign Goalie to Lynx. Press release.
(21 Oct 2006). Lynx Smite Gladiators. Press release.
(6 Nov 2006). Paw Prints. Press release.
Cornell Big Red . David McKee. Retrieved 26 Nov 2006.
Internet Hockey Database. . Retrieved 26 Nov 2006.
Sports Network, The. Selanne, Giguere too much for Sharks . 22 Nov 2006.
USA Hockey. 2006 USA Men's National Hockey Team Media Guide. Retrieved 26 Nov 2006.

External links

1983 births
Living people
American men's ice hockey goaltenders
Augusta Lynx players
Cornell Big Red men's ice hockey players
Ice hockey people from Texas
People from Midland, Texas
AHCA Division I men's ice hockey All-Americans